The Carnarvon xeric shrublands is a deserts and xeric shrublands ecoregion of Western Australia. The ecoregion is coterminous with the Carnarvon Interim Biogeographic Regionalisation for Australia (IBRA) bioregion.

Location and description
The ecoregion covers an area of 90,500 square kilometers (34,900 square miles) from the bounded by the Indian Ocean to the west from the Peron Peninsula in Shark Bay up to the North West Cape. The Pilbara shrublands lie to the northeast, the Western Australian mulga shrublands to the east, and the Southwest Australia savanna to the south. The region is named for the coastal town of Carnarvon and includes a number of coastal towns and tourist resorts.

The terrain is generally low, and the vegetation varies with the underlying geology, which consists mostly of recent alluvial, aeolian, and marine sediments over cretaceous strata. This is a very dry region with less than 250mm of rainfall per year.

The ecoregion covers the on-shore portion of the Carnarvon Basin, a physiographic province of the larger West Australian Shield division.

Sub-regions
The Carnarvon bioregion has two sub-regions:
Wooramel, which is a significant part of the Shark Bay World Heritage area
Cape Range

Flora
Low samphire and saltbush shrublands cover the saline alluvial plains, snakewood (Acacia xiphophylla) scrublands cover the clay flats, Bowgada (Acacia ramulosa) low woodland covers sandy ridges and plains, red sand dune fields are interspersed or overlain with tree to shrub steppe over hummock grasslands, and Acacia startii/A. bivenosa shrublands cover limestone outcrops in the north. Other trees in the area include limestone wattle (Acacia sclerosperma) with an undergrowth of dead finish (Acacia tetragonophylla). The sheltered embayments and extensive tidal flats along the coast support mangroves.

Fauna
Wildlife of the area includes birds such as the thick-billed grasswren and the red-tailed black cockatoo. This is also the area where it is possible that there may be a surviving population of the lesser stick-nest rat which is thought to be extinct.

Protected areas
Protected areas in the ecoregion include Cape Range National Park, Francois Peron National Park and Kennedy Range National Park.

Further reading
 
 Thackway, R and I D Cresswell (1995) An interim biogeographic regionalisation for Australia : a framework for setting priorities in the National Reserves System Cooperative Program Version 4.0 Canberra : Australian Nature Conservation Agency, Reserve Systems Unit, 1995. 
 Kendrick, Peter and Roland Mau (2002). "Carnarvon 1 (CAR1 - Cape Range subregion)". A Biodiversity Audit of Western Australia’s 53 Biogeographical Subregions in 2002. Department of Conservation and Land Management, Government of Western Australia. 
 Desmond, Anthony and Alanna Chant (2001). "Carnarvon 2 (CAR2 – Wooramel subregion)". A Biodiversity Audit of Western Australia’s 53 Biogeographical Subregions in 2002. Department of Conservation and Land Management, Government of Western Australia.

References

Deserts and xeric shrublands
Ecoregions of Western Australia
IBRA regions
Physiographic provinces